The Real World: Sydney is the nineteenth season of MTV's reality television series The Real World, which focuses on a group of diverse strangers living together for several months in a different city each season, as cameras follow their lives and interpersonal relationships. It is the only season to be filmed in Australia.

The season featured a total of eight cast members over the course of the season, as one cast member was replaced after she voluntarily left the show. It is the third of four seasons of The Real World to be filmed entirely outside of the United States after The Real World: London in 1995, The Real World: Paris in 2003, and before The Real World: Cancun in 2009.

Production lasted from February to May 26, 2007 and premiered on August 8 of that year, consisting of 24 episodes.

Assignment
Most seasons of The Real World, beginning with the fifth season, have included the assignment of a season-long group job or task to the housemates, continued participation in which has been mandatory to remain part of the cast since the Back to New York season. The Sydney cast was assigned to work for Contiki Tours, a vacation travel package planning company, creating a Sydney tour package.

The residence
The cast was housed in the contemporary , three-story former OneSport World Building at 19 Darling Walk at the southern end of Darling Harbour, a large recreational and pedestrian district on the western edge of the Sydney central business district. OneSport Darling Harbour was a sports-themed venue for hosting a variety of different events, and could accommodate up to 1,100 people. It closed at some point prior to June 2006, when it was leased to the Real World production, which held the lease until June 2007. The building and the rest of the Darling Walk Complex were demolished in late 2008, to be replaced by a $500 million development that included the Commonwealth Bank's global headquarters buildings, retail space, and a new park.

Cast
Cast members were first photographed and identified by the media while participating in a Contiki tour at the Tjapukai Aboriginal Cultural Park in Cairns, Queensland.

On August 1, 2007, the New York Daily News reported that according to MTV, Persian-American cast member Parisa Montazaran is the show's first Muslim. However, Tami Roman of the 1993 Los Angeles season is a Muslim, as is Mohammed Bilal of the 1994 San Francisco season. 
 

: Age at the time of filming.

Duration of cast 

Notes
Shauvon voluntarily left the house in Episode 14 after wanting to return home.
Ashli replaced Shauvon in Episode 15.
Trisha was removed from the house in Episode 18 after shoving Parisa to the floor during a heated altercation.

Episodes

After filming
All eight cast members reunited for Escape from Oz: The Real World Sydney Reunion. Hosted by Lyndsey Rodrigues, the show was filmed in New York, and premiered January 9, 2008. The cast members discussed their lives both during and since the filming of the show. Dunbar stated that he and Julie were still together, and had moved in together, though there was still occasional tension as a result of his infidelity with Ashli. The cast also discussed his temper flare-ups with Parisa and Ashli. Cohutta and KellyAnne revealed that they were still together, and that KellyAnne visited North Georgia, where she met Cohutta's father. (Their romance ended by the time they appeared on Real World/Road Rules Challenge: The Island.) Isaac stated that his now-long-distance relationship with Noirin was "complicated", that they were talking, and that its future was ambiguous. Shauvon revealed that she and David were no longer together. She and the others also discussed the "Grilled Cheese Incident". Trisha and Parisa discussed their love triangle with Alex, and the shoving incident, both asserting that there were no remaining ill feelings between them. Trisha also explained the incident with the Asian McDonald's employee by saying that she mis-worded her initial explanation of the incident, but that it was not motivated by racism. She also insisted that her refusal to go to the gay pride parade was not motivated by homophobia, as she supports gay rights, but felt a conflict between the amount of partying she had been doing and her religious upbringing, and decided not to go out partying again, regardless of what the celebration was for.

At the 2008 The Real World Awards Bash, KellyAnne was nominated in the "Hottest Female" category and Isaac in the "Hottest Male" one, KellyAnne and Cohutta were also in the running for "Favorite Love Story", as well as Dunbar for "Best Phonecall Gone Bad", and both Shauvon and Trisha for "Gone Baby Gone", with the latter also receiving a nomination for the "Roommate you Love to Hate" award.

On November 5, 2008, it was revealed on the Real World/Road Rules Challenge: The Island reunion special that KellyAnne Judd was dating Wes Bergmann of The Real World: Austin at the time. In an extra clip of the reunion for Real World/Road Rules Challenge: The Ruins, which aired December 16, 2009, Wes and KellyAnne revealed that they were no longer together, but were attempting to resolve the status of their relationship.

In 2009, Isaac and Noirin eventually broke up. In 2010, they both appeared on the tenth series of the British version Big Brother. Norin entered on Day 1, while Isacc entered on Day 54. Noirin was evicted by the Viewer's Vote on Day 56, with Isaac choosing to leave shortly after.

Cohutta Grindstaff and Isaac Stout opened and co-own a concert venue, The Bad Manor, in Athens, Georgia. It opened May 8, 2010, and it is located in downtown Athens at 346 E. Broad St.

Parisa Montazaran's debut album, Intelegance, which mixes hip-hop and dance beats with influences from her Persian heritage, was released November 24, 2008.

In 2012, Dunbar published a paperback titled Crazy Sh*t Republicans Say.

The Challenge

Challenge in bold indicates that the contestant was a finalist on the Challenge. 
Note: KellyAnne, Dunbar, Ashli, and Isaac were originally cast for The Challenge: Battle of the Seasons, and flew out to Turkey to participate. However, they were removed prior to the start of the first challenge due to Stout supposedly not passing his medical test, which turned out to be a false negative, and they were replaced by the Fresh Meat team.

References

External links
MTV's Official The Real World: Sydney Site
Parisa Montazaran's official MySpace page

Sydney
Television shows set in Sydney
2007 American television seasons
2008 American television seasons
Television shows filmed in Australia